Boise is a U.S.  ghost town in Oldham County, Texas. It lies east of Glenrio and south of Interstate 40, at an elevation of 4,003 feet (1,220 m).

References

Geography of Oldham County, Texas
Ghost towns in the Texas Panhandle
Ghost towns on U.S. Route 66